Marie-Claire Caron-Harant is a French football player who played as a forward for French club  Stade de Reims of the Division 1 Féminine. Caron-Harant represented France in the first FIFA sanctioned women's international against the Netherlands, Caron-Harant scored on her debut.

References

1945 births
Stade de Reims Féminines players
French women's footballers
France women's international footballers
Division 1 Féminine players
Women's association football forwards
Living people